Matthew Christopher Miller (born June 29, 1982), better known as Matthew Mercer, is an American voice actor. He is best known for his work with Studiopolis, Funimation, Bang Zoom! Entertainment, Viz Media, and NYAV Post in anime, cartoons, and video games. 

In anime, Mercer voices Levi Ackerman in Attack on Titan, Kiritsugu Emiya in Fate/Zero, Jotaro Kujo in JoJo's Bizarre Adventure, Aikurō Mikisugi in Kill la Kill, Kanji Tatsumi during the second half of Persona 4: The Animation, the second voice of Yamato and Pain in Naruto, Trafalgar Law in the Funimation dub of One Piece, Hit in Dragon Ball Super, Seijirou Kikuoka in Sword Art Online, Falco in ‘’Cyberpunk: Edgerunners’’, and Leorio in Hunter x Hunter. 

In video games, Mercer voices Leon S. Kennedy in Resident Evil 6, Kurtis Stryker in Mortal Kombat 9, Chrom and Ryoma in Fire Emblem, Jack Cooper in Titanfall 2, Espio the Chameleon in Sonic the Hedgehog, Deadshot in Injustice 2, Cole Cassidy (Jesse McCree) in Overwatch, Yusuke Kitagawa in Persona 5, MacCready in Fallout 4, Midas and Syd in Fortnite: Battle Royale and Fortnite: Save the World respectively, Edér Teylecg and Aloth Corfiser in Pillars of Eternity, Gangplank and Kindred's Wolf in League of Legends, Walter in Shin Megami Tensei IV and Ira from Kingdom Hearts.

In addition to his voice acting work, Mercer has developed and served as the Dungeon Master for the Dungeons & Dragons web series Critical Role since 2015. He is also a game designer and the chief creative officer of Critical Role Productions.

Early life
Mercer was born Matthew Christopher Miller in Palm Beach Gardens, Florida, on June 29, 1982, to a family of Scottish descent. His family moved to Los Angeles when he was eight. He attended Agoura High School in Agoura Hills, California. He has a brother who writes and performs music under the stage name Dave Heatwave. He spoke with a stutter when he was young; his father, who also stuttered, got him a speech therapist who reduced the effects to the point that only certain words trigger it. He decided to adopt "Mercer", which members of his family had used in the past, as his stage surname because his birth name was too similar to someone already represented by the actor's union SAG-AFTRA. He had a stint as a member of The Groundlings.

Career

Mercer began his career performing English walla and additional characters in several Japanese anime, and has since also worked in cartoons, video games, and radio commercials. He has been a guest at conventions around the world, hosting at events such as Anime Expo and Anime Matsuri. His work has expanded to a multitude of roles in cartoons, video games and radio commercials. He directed and produced the web series There Will Be Brawl, based on the Super Smash Bros. video game series, where he provided the voices for Meta Knight and portrayed the role of Ganondorf. He also acted in several shows from the Geek & Sundry and Nerdist networks and produced the web series Fear News with the Last Girl for FEARnet which was a 2010 Webby Awards Honoree for the Experimental & Weird category.

In 2016, Mercer served as the Dungeon Master for Force Grey: Giant Hunters, which ran for 2 seasons. In 2017, he was the Dungeon Master for the Nerdist show CelebriD&D, which puts D&D-playing celebrities into a small, mini-campaign where they are paired with role-players. He has also been a player in other actual play web series such as Dimension 20 and L.A. by Night.

Critical Role 
Mercer is the Dungeon Master of the web series Critical Role, which launched on Geek & Sundry in 2015, where he leads several other voice actors through a Dungeons & Dragons campaign. Critical Role was both the Webby Winner and the People's Voice Winner in the "Games (Video Series & Channels)" category at the 2019 Webby Awards; the show was also both a Finalist and the Audience Honor Winner in the "Games" category at the 2019 Shorty Awards.

After becoming hugely successful, the Critical Role cast left the Geek & Sundry network in early 2019 and set up their own production company, Critical Role Productions; Mercer is the company's chief creative officer. Soon after, they aimed to raise $750,000 on Kickstarter to create an animated series of their first campaign, but ended up raising over $11 million. In November 2019, Amazon Prime Video announced that they had acquired the streaming rights to this animated series, now titled The Legend of Vox Machina; Mercer reprised his role as Sylas Briarwood and other characters.

In October 2020, Mercer became the creative advisor for the Critical Role board and card game imprint called Darrington Press. From June to August 2021, Mercer appeared on Exandria Unlimited, a spinoff of Critical Role, as a player. In March 2022, he reprised his role in the two part special Exandria Unlimited: Kymal.

Game design 
Mercer's work as Dungeon Master has led to the development of three campaign setting books being published about his world of Exandria. The first is the Critical Role: Tal'Dorei Campaign Setting (2017) published through Green Ronin Publishing. The second is the Explorer's Guide to Wildemount (2020) published through Wizards of the Coast, thus making Exandria an official Dungeons and Dragons campaign setting. The third is Tal'Dorei Campaign Setting Reborn (2022), a revised and expanded edition of the Tal'Dorei Campaign Setting, which was published by Darrington Press, the publishing label created by Critical Role Productions. Tal'Dorei Campaign Setting Reborn was nominated for the 2022 ENNIE Awards in the "Best Setting" category.

On March 15, 2022, a new adventure module titled Critical Role: Call of the Netherdeep (2022), with Mercer, James Haeck and Chris Perkins as lead designers, was released. It is the second collaboration book between Wizards of the Coast and Critical Role Productions.

Personal life
Mercer married voice actress and Critical Role co-star Marisha Ray on October 21, 2017. His proposal was wildly popular among fans as he created an escape room game with the Critical Role cast to propose to Marisha. They live in Los Angeles with their dog, a corgi named Omar.

In an October 2018 interview, Mercer revealed that he suffers from body dysmorphic disorder and, according to him, has always struggled with his physical appearance.

As an activist, he works with various LGBTQ+ rights charities like OutRight Action International.

Filmography

Voice acting

Anime

Animation

Films

Video games

Other media

Live-action

Films

Web series

Bibliography

Role-playing games 
 Critical Role: Tal'Dorei Campaign Setting (writer, Green Ronin Publishing, 2017)
 Explorer's Guide to Wildemount (writer, Wizards of the Coast, 2020)
 Doom Eternal Assault on Armaros Station (writer, Critical Role Productions, 2020)
 Tal'Dorei Campaign Setting Reborn (writer, Darrington Press, 2022)
 Critical Role: Call of the Netherdeep (writer, Wizards of the Coast, 2022)

Notes

References

External links

 
 
 
 

Living people
1982 births
American male video game actors
American male voice actors
21st-century American male actors
20th-century American male actors
People from Los Angeles
Male actors from Los Angeles
American LGBT rights activists
Web series producers
American male web series actors